Ruudi Toomsalu (2 April 1913 – 3 August 2002) was an Estonian sprinter. He competed in the men's 100 metres at the 1936 Summer Olympics.

Acknowledgements
Meritorious Sportsman of the Estonian SSR (1965)
Order of the White Star, Class V (1998)

References

1913 births
2002 deaths
Athletes from Tallinn
People from the Governorate of Estonia
Estonian male sprinters
Estonian male long jumpers
Olympic athletes of Estonia
Athletes (track and field) at the 1936 Summer Olympics
Recipients of the Order of the White Star, 5th Class
Burials at Metsakalmistu